Cherry Grove Beach, sometimes known as Cherry Grove, is a neighborhood of the city of North Myrtle Beach in Horry County, South Carolina, United States. It lies along South Carolina Highway 9 and South Carolina Highway 65. The Cherry Grove Pier is a popular landmark of Cherry Grove. It was built early in the 1950s. It has weathered many hurricanes, and was remodeled and lengthened in 1999 after Hurricane Floyd. In 1968 Cherry Grove Beach merged with Windy Hill Beach, Ocean Drive Beach, and Crescent Beach to form the city of North Myrtle Beach.

Sister beaches
North Myrtle Beach
Crescent Beach
Windy Hill Beach
Ocean Drive Beach

Major highways
 SC 9
 SC 65

See also
Crescent Beach
Atlantic Beach
Myrtle Beach
North Myrtle Beach

References

External links
Visit Cherry Grove - Area Information & Things To Do Guide 

Neighborhoods in South Carolina
Populated places in Horry County, South Carolina